Optical path (OP) is the trajectory that a light ray follows as it propagates through an optical medium.
The geometrical optical-path length or simply geometrical path length (GPD) is the length of a segment in a given OP, i.e., the Euclidean distance integrated along a ray between any two points.
The mechanical length of an optical device can be reduced to less than the GPD by using folded optics. 
The optical path length in a homogeneous medium is the GPD multiplied by the refractive index of the medium.

Factors affecting optical path
Path of light in medium, or between two media is affected by the following:
 Reflection
 Total internal reflection
 Refraction
 Dispersion of light
 Absorption

Simple materials used
 Lenses
 Prisms
 Mirrors
 Transparent materials (e.g. optical filters)
 Translucent materials (e.g. frosted glass)
 Opaque materials

References

Physical optics
Geometrical optics